Léoncé Oleffe (25 August 1897 – 19 November 1972) was a Belgian middle-distance runner. He competed in the men's 800 metres at the 1920 Summer Olympics.

References

External links

1897 births
1972 deaths
Athletes (track and field) at the 1920 Summer Olympics
Belgian male middle-distance runners
Olympic athletes of Belgium